Antibody therapy may refer to several different uses of antibodies for the treatment of medical conditions.

Monoclonal antibody therapy
Oligoclonal antibody therapy e.g. MM-151
Antiserum
Intravenous immunoglobulin